Euphorbia nigrispinoides is a species of plant in the family Euphorbiaceae. It is endemic to Ethiopia.

References

 

Endemic flora of Ethiopia
nigrispinioides
Near threatened plants
Taxonomy articles created by Polbot
Taxobox binomials not recognized by IUCN